William Y. Hutchinson (4 September 1916 – 4 December 2006) was an American industrialist and philanthropist, the chairman of the Board of the Continental Scale Corporation,. He received a BA from Cornell University and an MBA from the University of Chicago. and also completed course work for a  PhD in philosophy from   Chicago. He later received an honorary   Doctor of Humane Letters from Garrett-Evangelical Theological Seminary, where he was also chairman of the board.
The Professorship in Ethics and Public Life at Cornell University is named after him and his wife, Wyn.

References

1916 births
2006 deaths
20th-century American educators
Cornell University alumni
20th-century American philanthropists
20th-century American philosophers
University of Chicago alumni